The Pitchfork Music Festival Paris 2012 was held on 1 to 3 November 2012 at the Grande halle de la Villette, Paris, France. The festival was headlined by M83, Animal Collective and Grizzly Bear.

Lineup
Headline performers are listed in boldface. Artists listed from latest to earliest set times.

Pre- and post-parties
The pre- and post-parties were held at the Le Trabendo. The opening party was held on 31 October and featured performances by Melody's Echo Chamber, Lotus Plaza, Clinic and College. The first day after-party was presented by R&S Records and the second day was presented by Italians Do It Better.

References

External links

Pitchfork Music Festival
2012 music festivals